The Nyholm Prize for Education commemorates the life and work of Australian-born chemist Sir Ronald Nyholm, who – alongside his research in coordination chemistry – passionately campaigned for the improvement of science education. He acted as president of the Royal Society of Chemistry from 1968 to 1970.

The prize, which was first awarded in 1973, is awarded biennially by the Royal Society of Chemistry. It recognises outstanding achievements by those working in chemical science education, specifically major contributions to national or international research or innovation.

Before 2008, the prize was known as the Sir Ronald Nyholm Lectureship (Education Division). The recipient receives £5,000, a medal and a certificate.

Recipients 

The recipients are:

 1973/74 – H F Halliwell
 1975/76 – Douglas James Millen 
 1977/78 – A K Holliday 
 1979/80 – A H Johnstone 
 1981/82 – M J Frazer 
 1982/83 – Peter J Fensham 
 1984/85 – Professor David J Waddington 
 1986/87 – M H Gardner 
 1988/89 – No award 
 1990/91 – R F Kempa 
 1992/93 – M Gomel 
 1994/95 – David Phillips 
 1996/97 – C. John Garratt 
 1998/99 – Peter Atkins 
 2000/01 – Patrick D Bailey 
 2002/03 – George M Bodner 
 2004/05 – Zafra M. Lerman 
 2006/07 – Norman Reid 
 2008/09 – David D Kumar
 2009 – Tina Overton
 2011 – Martyn Poliakoff
 2013 – Peter Wothers
 2015 – 
 2017 – Dudley Shallcross, University of Bristol
 2019 – Marcy Towns, Purdue University

See also
 List of chemistry awards

References 

Awards of the Royal Society of Chemistry
Awards established in 1973